Tons of Money is a 1930 British comedy film directed by Tom Walls and starring Ralph Lynn, Yvonne Arnaud, Mary Brough, Robertson Hare and Gordon James, the same artistes responsible for the Aldwych farces. It was a remake of the 1924 film Tons of Money which had been based on the 1922 play Tons of Money by Will Evans and Arthur Valentine. It was made at British and Dominion's Elstree Studios with sets designed by the art director Lawrence P. Williams.

Premise
A debt-ridden inventor has to pretend to be his cousin to avoid his creditors.

Cast
 Ralph Lynn as Aubrey Allington  
 Yvonne Arnaud as Louise Allington  
 Mary Brough as Benita Mullet  
 Robertson Hare as Chesterman  
 Gordon James as George Maitland  
 Madge Saunders as Jane Everard  
 Philip Hewland as Henry  
 Willie Warde as Giles  
 John Turnbull as Sprules  
 Peggy Douglas as Simpson - the maid

References

Bibliography
 Low, Rachael. Filmmaking in 1930s Britain. George Allen & Unwin, 1985.
 Wood, Linda. British Films, 1927-1939. British Film Institute, 1986.

External links

1930 films
1930 comedy films
Films directed by Tom Walls
British films based on plays
British comedy films
Films set in England
British black-and-white films
Remakes of British films
Sound film remakes of silent films
British and Dominions Studios films
Films shot at Imperial Studios, Elstree
1930s English-language films
1930s British films